Barsuki is a rural locality (a village) in Denyatinskoye Rural Settlement, Melenkovsky District, Vladimir Oblast, Russia. The population was 4 as of 2010.

Geography 
Barsuki is located 29 km north of Melenki (the district's administrative centre) by road. Levino is the nearest rural locality.

References 

Rural localities in Melenkovsky District